Sujeet Kumar (Odia:ସୁଜୀତ କୁମାର) is an Indian politician of the Biju Janata Dal party and a Member of Parliament (MP), representing Odisha in the Rajya Sabha(The Council of States or The Upper House), since 2020.He is also a Lawyer and trained Arbitrator, and practicing in the Supreme Court of India, various High Courts and Tribunals. He is currently the Chairman of the Committee on Petitions of Rajya Sabha, one of the youngest ever to chair a Parliamentary Committee. He earlier served as the Advisor, in the rank of Chief Secretary, to the Special Development Council (SDC) of Government of Odisha and as the Special Secretary of Odisha State Planning Board, very senior policy planning positions with Government of Odisha.

Education 
Hailing from Bhawanipatna in Kalahandi district of Odisha, Kumar completed his primary education in his native district. Later he completed Bachelor of Engineering (BE) from Veer Surendra Sai University of Technology (formerly UCE Burla) and Bachelor of Laws (LLB) from Sambalpur University. Kumar received the prestigious inaugural Skoll Scholarship for Social Entrepreneurship which enabled him to study MBA at Saïd Business School, Oxford University. Kumar acquired his second masters Degree from the prestigious Harvard Kennedy School (HKS), Harvard University; where he received his Master in Public Administration (MPA) degree.

Career 
Kumar started his corporate career as a software engineer with Infosys Technologies Ltd. Later, he shifted to the development sector and worked with the United Nations Development Programme (UNDP); managing its ‘ICT for Development’ Project in Odisha, working to bring digital technology to the remote regions of the state. Kumar later worked at the World Economic Forum (WEF) in Geneva, Switzerland where he designed and managed key projects of the WEF. 

He relocated to India in 2011 and founded a social enterprise, Kalinga Kusum Foundation, and a business/legal consulting firm LexMantra LLP. Currently, he serves as an advisor/ mentor in these two entities, providing them with strategic direction and guidance.

Sujeet Kumar has unique multi-disciplinary experiences, in the corporate, government and development sectors (international, national and grass-roots). He has traveled widely and spoken in numerous conferences and forums in India and abroad.  He received the prestigious Youth Inspiration Award of 2017 for his innovative work as a policymaker, legal entrepreneur and for his cutting-edge work at the interface of law, technology, development, and public policy.

On 22 December 2021, Sujeet Kumar was unanimously appointed as the convenor of All Party Indian Parliamentary Forum for Tibet. Kumar is a founding member of the Formosa Club Indo-Pacific chapter and co-chair of the Inter-Parliamentary Alliance on China (IPAC).

Legal Practice 
Kumar is currently a legal practitioner at the Supreme Court of India, various High Courts & Tribunals. He has also founded  a law firm providing services for domestic and overseas corporations, multinational companies, multi-lateral & government agencies, investors and individuals. 
Kumar is a Life Member of Orissa High Court Bar Association, International Bar Association, The International Centre for Alternative Dispute Resolution (ICADR), Indian Council of Arbitration (ICA), Construction Industry Arbitration Council (CIAC), Indian Institute of Public Administration (IIPA), member of Supreme Court of India Bar Association and a Patron Member of Bar Association of India (BAI).

Parliamentary Committees 
Kumar is currently a member of several Parliamentary Committees: 

1. Chairman, Committee on Petitions of Rajya Sabha 

2. Member, Standing Committee on Home Affairs

3. Member, Committee on Official Language

4. Member, Consultative Committee for the Ministry of External Affairs

5. Member, Joint Committee on the Multi-State Cooperative Societies (Amendment) Bill, 2022 

6. Member, Joint Committee on Jan Vishwas (Amendment Of Provisions) Bill, 2022

Private Members Bills 
Kumar has introduced several Private Members' Bills in Parliament over some very important issues. Key Bills introduced are:

1. The Net Zero Emissions Bill, 2022 – The Bill provides a framework for achieving net zero emissions by the year 2070 as per India's nationally determined contributions under the United Nations Framework Convention on Climate Change and to provide relief for vulnerable persons and communities from drastic climate events in the form of maintaining a vulnerable population registry at the State and the district levels. 

2.	The Code Of Criminal Procedure (Amendment) Bill, 2022 – The proposed Bill is presented to redefine a procedural framework with regard to the bail provisions as The Code of Criminal Procedure does not define the words 'Bail' and 'Anticipatory Bail', and only categorizes the offence into bailable or non-bailable. 

3. The Cigarettes and Other Tobacco Products (prohibition of advertisement and regulation of trade and commerce, production, supply and distribution) (Amendment) Bill, 2022 - The Bill intends to amend the Cigarettes and Other Tobacco Products (Prohibition of Advertisement and Regulation of Trade and Commerce, Production, Supply and Distribution) Act, 2003 by advocating for a comprehensive ban on tobacco use in the public place and prohibiting the sale of cigarette or other tobacco products to person below the age of twenty-one years.

4. The Prevention and Prohibition of Witch-branding and Witch-hunting and other Harmful Practices Bill, 2022 – The Bill intends to provide for effective measures to prevent, prohibit and protect persons especially women from witch-branding and witch-hunting, to eliminate their torture, oppression, humiliation, killing, sexual assault, stigmatization, discrimination, ostracization by providing punishment for such offences, relief and rehabilitation of victims of such offences.

5.	The Legislation and Expenditure Accountability Bill, 2022 - The Bill intends to bring about accountability and Parliamentary oversight to the legislative and policy-making process in the country, and to improve the quality of expenditure made by the Union Government.

Public Cause

SDC Cup 2020 
During his stint as the Advisor to Special Development Council (SDC), Government of Odisha, Kumar spearheaded the SDC Cup 2020 which brought together indigenous youths of Odisha to play competitive football at the district and state levels. Odisha Chief Minister Naveen Patnaik and Indian football legend Bhaichung Bhutia attended the final match of the tournament, played at the historic Barabati Stadium, Cuttack. This unique football championship, organised with the support of Football Association of Odisha (FAO) and All India Football Federation (AIFF) involved over 10,000 tribal youths in men and women categories, in the nine tribal-dominated districts of Odisha.

Kalahandi Dialogue 
Kumar’s brainchild “Kalahandi Dialogue” (http://www.kalahandidialogue.org/), was organised at Kalahandi in September 2018, as a collaborative platform for engaging all the stakeholders (global leaders, policymakers, development practitioners, entrepreneurs & social entrepreneurs, elected representatives, public intellectuals and the local citizens of Kalahandi) in the development discourse and action; which became profusely successful and inspired other such development dialogue platforms.

Legislative Engagement 
Kumar has led a legislative engagement and advocacy initiative at Kalinga Kusum, a non-profit organization (www.kalingakusum.org) in partnership with UNICEF, to orient Odisha Legislative Assembly members (MLAs), in the areas of budgeting, child rights, and ease of doing business. Kumar provides mentorship support to Kalinga Kusum. Being a technocrat, he advocates for the usage of Technology in various aspects of Governance and solving critical issues being faced by the country.

Child Friendly Constituency (CFC) 
Sujeet Kumar has taken leadership in conceptualizing and driving an innovative initiative-the Child-Friendly Constituency (CFC). He, in collaboration with Kalinga Kusum Foundation & UNICEF, has been proactive in promoting the idea of Child-Friendly Constituencies across the state. Assisted by the then local MLA, Mr. Anubhav Patnaik, the first-ever CFC project in India has been implemented in the Khandapada Assembly Constituency of Nayagarh district of Odisha, earning rare acclaim by UNICEF.

Awards, Recognition and Honorary positions 
 Odisha Youth Inspiration Award 2017, Odisha Diary Foundation 
 Mason Scholar and Hauser Fellow, Harvard Kennedy School, 2010–11
 Asia Pacific Leadership Fellow (APLP) at East West Centre, Hawaii, 2009-10 
 Chair of Young Indians (Yi), Bhubaneswar Chapter 2012-13 
 Global Leadership Fellow, One of twenty fellows selected by the World Economic Forum (WEF), Switzerland from about 3000 odd applicants, 2006 
 Adjunct Faculty, Sri Sri University (SSU) & Advisor, SSU Global Centre for Indigenous Study

References 
12. https://srisriuniversity.edu.in/sujeet-kumar/

13. https://piindia.org/partners-details.html?partnerName=SujeetKumar&partnerType=parliament 

14. https://rajyasabha.nic.in/Members/Alphabetical

15.https://www.thehindu.com/news/national/javadekar-appointed-head-of-rajya-sabhas-ethics-panel/article66110011.ece

16.https://odishatv.in/odisha-news/otherstories/sujit-kumar-appointed-spl-secy-of-planning-board-119508

17.https://skollscholarship.org/people/sujeet-kumar

18.http://sparged.org/board-of-directors

19.https://thewire.in/diplomacy/chinese-embassy-writes-to-mps-who-attended-meeting-to-revive-all-party-group-on-tibet

20.https://www.thehindu.com/news/national/javadekar-appointed-head-of-rajya-sabhas-ethics-panel/article66110011.ece

21.https://interviewtimes.net/bjd-mp-sujeet-kumar-appointed-as-member-of-consultative-committee-for-ministry-of-external-affairs/

22.https://www.siasat.com/national-judicial-commission-bill-introduced-in-rajya-sabha-aap-opposes-2476211/

23.https://timesofindia.indiatimes.com/city/bhubaneswar/football-tourney-in-tribal-dists-to-find-nurture-hidden-talents/articleshow/74290848.cms

24.https://www.business-standard.com/article/pti-stories/naveen-inaugurates-kalahandi-dialogue-conclave-118092801213_1.html

Alumni of Saïd Business School
Biju Janata Dal politicians
Harvard Kennedy School alumni
Living people
People from Kalahandi district
Rajya Sabha members from Odisha
Year of birth missing (living people)